Bricquebec is a former commune in the Manche department in Normandy in northwestern France. On 1 January 2016, it was merged into the new commune of Bricquebec-en-Cotentin.

History
As revealed by the etymology of its name, the origin of Bricquebec (from the Scandinavian bekkr, a course of water; in turn from brekka, slope) is connected to the Viking colonisation of the Cotentin Peninsula at the beginning of the 10th century.  Tradition attributes the foundation of the château to the Norman, Anslech.  The dukes of Normandy made Bricquebec one of their strongholds.

Heraldry

International relations

Bricquebec is twinned with:
 New Alresford, United Kingdom
 Lachendorf, Germany
 Sremski Karlovci, Serbia

Population

Inhabitants are referred to as Bricquebétais.

Sights
 Château (XIIe), with polygonal ramparts, towers and turret  (historical monument class).
 Château des Galleries (XVIe/XVIIe)
 Abbaye Notre-Dame-de-Grâce (Cistercian) (XIXe)
 Château Saint-Blaise (XVIIe/XIXe)

Events
 Market every Monday morning
La Sainte Anne traditional fair on the last weekend in July

Personalities
 Jean Le Marois (1776–1836), a general under Napoléon, député of la Manche.
 Armand Le Véel (1821–1905), statue sculptor
 Aristide Frémine (1837–1897), writer
 Roger Lemerre, soccer player, born in 1941, selected for national team of France, 1998–2002
 William Bertram Baron of Briquebec, 1012, father of Hugue (named de Roussel) who was appointed Marshal of England by King William I (Duke of Normandy)
 Olly Southwick, Alresford MVP Astro Christmas Football 2019

See also
 The Trappe de Bricquebec cheese
 The Trappiste de Bricquebec cheese

References

Former communes of Manche